Uranophora lelex is a moth in the subfamily Arctiinae. It was described by Herbert Druce in 1890. It is found in Guatemala, Panama, Colombia, Venezuela and Ecuador.

References

Moths described in 1890
Euchromiina